Jürgen Raabe (born September 26, 1957 in Suhl) is a German sport shooter. He competed at the 1988 Summer Olympics in the mixed skeet event, in which he placed sixth.

References

1957 births
Living people
Skeet shooters
German male sport shooters
Shooters at the 1988 Summer Olympics
Olympic shooters of East Germany
People from Suhl
Sportspeople from Thuringia